The East Calcutta Wetlands, (22 0 27’ N 88 0 27’ E), are a complex of natural and human-made wetlands lying east of the city of Calcutta (Kolkata), of West Bengal in India. The wetlands cover 125 square kilometres and include salt marshes, and agricultural fields, sewage farms and settling ponds. The wetlands are also used to treat Kolkata's sewage, and the nutrients contained in the wastewater sustain fish farms and agriculture.

The name East Calcutta Wetlands was coined by late Dhrubajyoti Ghosh, Special Advisory (Agricultural Ecosystems), Commission on Ecosystem Management, IUCN, who reached this incredible but neglected part of the city when, while working as an engineer for the Government of West Bengal's Water & Sanitation Department, he was searching for an answer to the question: What exactly happens to the city sewage? These natural water bodies which were known just as fisheries provided the answer. Devised by local fishermen and farmers, these wetlands served, in effect, as the natural sewage treatment plant for the city. The East Kolkata Wetlands host the largest sewage fed aquaculture in the world. .

Protecting the East Kolkata Wetlands 

In 1991 the West Bengal Government accepted an offer by a non-resident Indian to build a World Trade Centre and allotted 227 acres of wetlands for this purpose. As a result, the NGO People United for Better Living in Calcutta (PUBLIC) filed a public interest litigation in the Calcutta High Court arguing for the importance of the wetlands and why they should be left as they were. The order of Justice Umesh Chandra Banerjee on this matter is considered a landmark judgment. Not only did it go into the definition of wetlands and a review of their status in countries such as Australia and the US, he also brought to bear his own research on their functional values and role in "maintaining micro-climatic conditions, absorbing pollution...habitat for aquatic flora fauna... providing a spill basin, and the fragility of the ecosystem." The outcome was that the proposal for the World Trade Centre was turned down in its original form and strict conditions were laid: "I do not find any justiciable reason to disagree with the opinion expressed by the environmentalists that wetland should be preserved and no interference or reclamation should be permitted."

Following the order of the Calcutta High Court in 1992,to its credit, the State Government did not appeal but accepted the ruling. In fact, the Environment Secretary, Kalyan Biswas, applied for the East Calcutta Wetlands to be designated a "wetland of international importance" under the Ramsar Convention. This was obtained in 2002. Finally, in 2006, as a reflection of state and civil society partnership, the East Kolkata Wetlands (Management & Conservation) Act was passed - the first such case of a major environmental legislation being enacted by a state - as distinct from the central - government.

Many city promoters have silently accepted the dominance of Bonani Kakkar . Many promoters have told anonymously that they settle with them with consideration otherwise the NGO PUBLIC run by Kakkar will take them to court. The business model of this is weaponising environmental issues and threat to promoters of court and police. Forcing them to settle.  That us why out of 25000 encroachment in EKW, the NGO PUBLIC has targeted only few.

Over the years, these wetlands have faced continuing threats and encroachment. In many instances, the original petitioner, PUBLIC, has had to go to court (High Court, Supreme Court, the National Green Tribunal) to argue on the basis of the 1992 judgment and the later EKW Act to ward off project proposals that were in fact disguised attempts at land-grabbing. While minor encroachments continue even today, the East Kolkata Wetlands still survive.
Conservation Methods:
1.	To demarcate the boundaries of the East Kolkata wetlands on the field.
2.	To take measures or make an order to stop, undo and prevent any unauthorised development project in, or unauthorised use of, or unauthorised act on, the East Kolkata wetlands.
3.	To make an order directing demolition or alteration of any hoarding, frame, post, kiosk, structure, neon-signed or sky-sign, erected or exhibited illegally for the purpose of advertisement on any land within the East Kolkata wetlands.
4.	To make an order to prevent, prohibit or restrict any mining, quarrying, blasting, or other operations for the purpose of protecting or conserving the East Kolkata wetlands.
5.	To take measures to abate pollution in the East Kolkata wetlands and conserve the flora, fauna and biodiversity in general.
6.	To prepare action plans conforming to the resolutions taken and recommendations made, from time to time, under the Ramsar Convention and to update the land use maps of the East Kolkata wetlands.
7.	To implement and monitor the activities specified in the action plans.
8.	To promote research and disseminate findings of such research among the stakeholders;
9.	To raise awareness about the utility of the wetlands in general and the East Kolkata wetlands in particular.
10.	To promote basic conservation principles like sewage fed pisciculture and eco-tourism in the East Kolkata wetlands.
11.	To enforce land use control in the substantially water body-oriented areas and other areas in the East Kolkata wetlands. 
12.	To detect changes of ecological character and in land use in the East Kolkata wetlands.
13.	To establish network with other Ramsar Sites in India.
14.	To conduct inquiry or scientific study within the scope of this project.
15.	To constitute expert committee within the scope of this project.
16.	To enter any land or premises, including to collect samples of air, water, soil and other biological resources, within the scope of this project.
17.	To call for relevant records and documents and information from any department, organisation or local body within the scope of this project.
18.	To do such act, or pass such order, which may be necessary and expedient for the purpose of conservation and management of the East Kolkata wetlands.

Flora
There are about 100 plant species, which have been recorded in and around the East Calcutta Wetlands, including
Sagittaria montividensis, Cryptocoryne ciliata, Cyperus spp., Acrostichum aureum, Ipomoea aquatica, etc. The Sunderbans used to extend up to Patuli in the 1950s.

Several kinds of water hyacinths grow across these wetlands. Local farmers and fisher folk use water hyacinth to create a buffer between land and water to minimise erosion.

The area is also home to large numbers of coconut and betel nut trees. Many varieties of vegetables are farmed here, including cauliflower, eggplant, pumpkin, sunflower and sacred basil. Tracts of land are dedicated to paddy cultivation as well.

Fauna
Numerous species of fish are farmed in the sewage-fed ponds called bheris in the East Kolkata wetlands. These include silver carp and tilapia.
The area is also home to the marsh mongoose and small Indian mongoose. Palm civet and small Indian civet are significant in and around East Calcutta Wetlands. Approximately 20 mammals are reported from this region. Snakes found in the East Calcutta Wetland include the checkered keelback (Fowlea piscator), smooth water snake (Enhydris enhydris), buff striped keelback (Amphiesma stolata) and bronze back tree snake (Tendrelaphis pristis). It is the type locality of a mammalian species called the Salt Lake marsh mongoose. Over 40 species of birds can be spotted at the wetlands. The process of urbanisation however, is leading to the disappearance of many bird species from the area. (Ghosh,A,K, 2004)

Sewage treatment 

Kolkata is an example of how natural wetlands are sometimes being utilised in developing countries. Using the purification capacity of wetlands, the Indian city of Kolkata has pioneered a system of sewage disposal. Originally built to house one million (10 lakh) people, Kolkata is now home to over 10 million (over 1 crore) people, with nearly one-third of them living in slums. But the 8,000-hectare East Kolkata Wetlands Ramsar Site, a patchwork of tree-fringed canals, vegetable plots, rice paddies and fish ponds – and the 20,000 people that work in them – daily transform one-third of the city's sewage and most of its domestic refuse into a rich harvest of fish and fresh vegetables. For example, the Mudially Fishermen's Cooperative Society is a collective of 300 families that lease 70 hectares into which wastewater from the city is released. Through a series of natural treatment processes – including the use of Eichhornia crassipes and other plants for absorbing oil, grease and heavy metals – the Cooperative has turned the area into a thriving fish farm and nature park.

Controversy
Recently illegal landfills are on the rise and the wetlands are being slowly assimilated in the stream city. This unprecedented land development and urbanisation are creating concerns about the impact on the environment. 
Wetlands are under threat due to exponential expansion of real-estate projects in eastern Kolkata especially in the Salt Lake and Rajarhat sectors. Nowadays, land encroachment and land alteration are the important aspect of threats for East Kolkata Wetland (EKW). Transformation from wetland to fishing pond, i.e., aquaculture field are become a potential threat to EKW (Ghosh et al. 2018).

Microbial Biodiversity
Microbial Diversity is an integral part of biodiversity which includes bacteria, archaea, fungi, algae, protozoa and protists (Ghosh, A., 2007). East Kolkata Wetland shows an immense diversity of flora and fauna both at the macro and micro level. Microbial richness of a region is its unseen asset that needs to be explored and conserved. Soil samples collected from ECW shows the presence of various new strains of microbes which are not only ecologically important but also have commercial value (Ghosh, A., 2007). These include Actinobacteria which are responsible for the degradation of nitrophenol, nitroaromatic compounds, pesticides and herbicides; Proteobacteria related to the bioremediation of heavy metals, degradation and recycling of woody tissues of plants, oil contaminated soil and toxic compounds and nitrogen fixation along with the cyanobacters; other bacteria playing important roles in metal accumulation, oil degradation, antimicrobial compound production, enzyme production etc. (Ghosh, A., 2007).

Role in climate change mitigation
Sewage fed aquaculture based artificial wetland, like East Kolkata Wetland (EKW), is a robust example of potential carbon sink and spin-off. EKW can sequester ~1.9 Mg C/ha/year, mitigating at least ~118 Gg atmospheric /year. Plus, carbon uptake by harvested fish crop corresponds to ~61 Gg /year - rewarding US$3.6/kg blue C harvested.

Conservation and Management Act
The East Kolkata Wetlands (Conservation and Management) Act, 2006 represents an important landmark as it paved way for establishment of the East Kolkata Wetlands Management Authority (EKWMA) for conservation and management of the EKW. The EKWMA is constituted under Section 3 of the Act, 2006. In 2017 Section 3(2) of the Act, 2006 has been amended and the composition of the EKWMA has been changed. The EKWMA is a thirteen (13) member body with the Chief Secretary, Government of West Bengal, Secretaries of different Departments of State Govt. as well as four experts nominated by the State Govt. under the chairmanship of Minister-in-Charge, Department of Environment, Government of West Bengal.
The EKWMA is guided by the East Kolkata Wetlands (Conservation and Management) Act, 2006, the East Kolkata Wetlands (Conservation and Management) Rules, 2006, and the Wetlands (Conservation and Management) Rules, 2017. This is probably only wetland which has state enacted laws as well as Central enacted laws applicable.

Sources
1. Urban Wastewater: Livelihoods, Health and Environmental Impacts in India: The Case of the East Calcutta Wetlands by Gautam Gupta, Jadavpur University (see: www.iwmi.cgiar.org/ ... /Urban%20Wastewater%20WS_Kolkata.pdf ).

2. S.Ray Choudhury, A. R. Thakur. Microbial Genetic Resource Mapping of East Kolkata Wetland.   Current Science, Vol. 91, No. 2, 2006 25 July.

3. Ghosh, A., Maity, B., Chakrabarti, K., Chattopadhyay, D. (2007). Bacterial diversity of East Calcutta Wet land area: possible identification of potential bacterial population for different biotechnological uses. Microb Ecol. Oct;54(3):452-9.

References
Maiti, P and Banerjee, S. (1999).  Heavy metal in wastewater ponds in and around Calcutta and their effect on Mammalian System contaminated through fish raised in wastewater improvement, Annual report (1998–1999), Department of Zoology, University of Calcutta.

Barbier, E.B., Acreman, M., and Knowler, D. (1997).  Economic valuation of wetlands - A
guide for policy makers and planners, Ramsar Copnvention Bureau, Gland, Switzerland.

Biswas, K. P. (1927). 'Flora of the Salt Lakes, Calcutta', Journal of Department of Science, University of Calcutta, vol. 8.

Bose, B.C. (1944). 'Calcutta sewage-fisheries culture', Proc. Natl. Inst. Sci. India, 10.

Brown, L. R. (2001).  Eco-Economy-Building an Economy for the Earth, Earthscan, London.

Chakraborty, S. (1970). 'Some consideration on the evolution of physiography of Bengal', in A. B. Chatterjee, A. Gupta, and P. K. Mukhopadhyay (eds.), West Bengal, Geographical  Institute, Presidency College, Firma K. L. Mukhopadhyay, Calcutta, India.

Clarke, W. (1865). 'Report of the project of The Salt Lake Reclamation & Irrigation Company Limited', in Selections from the Records of the Bengal Government (containing papers from 1865 to 1904), Calcutta, India.

CMG (1945). 'Some facts about Calcutta drainage', in A. Home (ed.), The Calcutta Municipal Gazette: Official organ of the corporation, Central Municipal Office, Calcutta, India, 42(7).

__ (1964). 'Reclamation of Salt Lakes - Dr. B. C. Roy's dream' in A. Home (ed.),  The Calcutta Municipal Gazette: Official organ of the Corporation of Calcutta, Central Municipal Office, Calcutta, India, 81(6&7). 
CMW&SA (1996). Sustaining Calcutta, Present Status Report of the Urban People's Environment, Calcutta Metropolitan Water and Sanitation Authority, Kolkata.

 (1997). Base line document for management action plan, East Calcutta Wetlands and Waste Recycling Region, Calcutta Metropolitan Water and Sanitation Authority, Kolkata.

Cook, C.D.K. (1996). Aquatic and Wetlands Plants of India. Oxford University Press.

Costanza, R., d'Agre, R.,m Groot, R. de, Farber, S., Grasso, M., Hannon, B., Limbujrg, K., Naeem, S.O., Neill, R. V., Paruelo, J., Raskin, R. G., Sutton P., and Belt, M. van den (1997).'The Value of the World's Ecosystem Services and Natural Capital', Nature, vol. 387.

Dasgupta, R. (1973). 'Contribution of botany of a portion of Salt Lakes, West Bengal', Ind.Mus. Bull., vol. 1.

David, A. (1959). 'Effect of Calcutta sewage upon the fisheries of the Kulti estuary and connected cultivable fisheries', Journal of Asiatic Society (Bengal), vol. 1, No. 4.

De, M., Bhunia, S., and Sengupta, T. (1989). 'A preliminary account of major wetland fauna of Calcutta and surroundings', Ecology, 3(9).

Deb, S. C., and Santra, S. C. (1996). 'Bio-accumulation of metals in sewage fed aquatic system - a case study from Calcutta (India)', International Journal of Environmental Studies.

Deb, S. C., Das, K. K., and Santra, S. C. (1996). 'Studies on the productivity of sewage-fed  ecosystem', Journal of Environmental Protection, 12.

DEC a (1945). 'History of the Gangetic Delta, Appendix 1 a', Report of the committee to inquire into the drainage conditions of Calcutta and adjoining area, Drainage Enquiry   Committee, Government of Bengalk, Calcutta, India.

b (1945). 'Draionage (rural) of the area falling with the outer zone, which is to be  investigated by the Calcutta Drainage Committee, Appendix IX', Reports of the committee to  inquire into the drainage condition of Calcutta and adjoining area, Drainage Enquiry  Committee, Government of Bengal, Calcutta, India.

DOE (1999). Development and Management of the Calcutta canal systems and wetlands, Report of the committee constituted by the Department of Environment, Government of West Bengal.

 (2001). Report of the committee to look into all aspects of the existing and permissible land uses in the East Kolkata Wetland Area, Department of Environment, Government of West Bengal. 
_ (2004)Report of the committee for formulation  of the guidelines for preparation of management plan of East Kolkata Wetland, Department of Environment, Government of West Bengal.
Department of Fisheries (1983). Report on study of heavy metal in sewage-fed fisheries,
Department of Fisheries, Government of West Bengal.

Douglas, J. S. (1972). Beginner's guide to applied ecology, Pelham Books, London.

Ekins, P. (1972). Beginner's guide to applied ecology, Pelham Books, London.

Ekins, P. (1992). A New World Order, Grassroot Movement for global change, Routledge,
London.

Farber, S., and Costanza, R. (1987).  'The economic value of wetland systems', Journal of Environmental Management, 24.

Ghosh,A.K(.1990 ). Biological Resources of East Calcutta Wetlands. Indian J Landscape System and Ecological Studies,13 (1):10 - 23

Ghosh,A.K and Chakrabarty, Satyesh(1997). Management of East Calcutta Wetlands and Canal Systems. A Report, CEMSAP,Dept.Environment Govt. West Bengal, 
1–188.

Ghosh,A.K. and Shreela Chakrabarti (1999).Human Interventions and Changing Status. Sci. Cult., 65:36 -38.
Ghosh,A.K.(2004). Avian Diversity of East Calcutta Wetlands. Environ,9 (1):8 - 13.
Ghosh, S. K., and Ghosh, D. (2003). Rehabilitating Biodiversity: A community-based initiatives in the East Calcutta Wetlands, A Communiqué published through WWF-India (W.B.S.O.), in collaboration with British Council Division, Kolkata.

Ghosh, D., and Furedy, C. (1984). 'Resource Conserving Traditions and Waste Disposal: The Garbage Farms and Sewage-fed Fisheries of Calcutta', Conservation and Recycling, Vol. 7, No. 2-4.

Ghosh, D., and Sen, S. (1987). 'Ecological History of Calcutta's Wetland Conservation', Environmental Conservation, vol. 14(3).

__(1992). 'Developing Waterlogged Areas for Urban Fishery and Waterfront Recreation Project', AMBIO, Journal of the Royal Swedish Academy of Sciences, vol. 21, No. 2.

Ghosh, D. (1978). Ecological Study of Some selected Urban and Semi-urban Centers of West Bengal and suggesting certain controls of the Ecosystem, Ph.D. thesis, University of Calcutta.

 (1983). Sewage treatment fisheries in East Calcutta Wetlands, mimeographed, (not available for checking), Reports to the Department of Fisheries, Government of West Bengal, Calcutta, India.

 (1992). 'The ecologically handicapped', The Statesman, 12 March.

 (1996). Turning around: for a community based technology. Calcutta Environment improvement, CMW&SA.

(1999). 'Rebellion of Nature and Need for a Global Convention on Consumption Imbalance', Journal of Indian Anthropological Society, 34.

(2001). 'Empowering the Ecologically Handicapped; in V. G. Martin and M. A. Parthasarathy (eds.), Wilderness and Humanity: the Global Issues, Flcrum Publishing, Golden, Colorado.

Ghosh, S. K. (2002). Reclamation and enhancement of biodiversity of the East Calcutta Wetlands, Project report prepared for British Council, Calcutta, implemented through WWF- India, West Bengal State Office.

 (2002) Wetland Ecosystem, West Bengal State Biodiversity Strategy and Action Plan, National Biodiversity Strategy and Action Plan, Department of Environment, Government of West Bengal and Ramkrishna Mission Narendrapur, West Bengal, India, executed by  Ministry of Environment and Forest, Government of India, technical implementation by Kalpavrissh and administrative co-ordination by Biotech Consortium, India Ltd., funded by Global Environmental Facility through UNDP.

Ghosh, S. K., and Ghosh D. (2003). Community based rehabilitation of wetlands in West Bengal, India, S. B. Ray et al. (ed.), Contemporary Studies in Natural Resource Management in India, Forest Studies Series, Inter-India Publication, New Delhi.

Ghosh, S./ K., and Mitra, A. (1997). Flora and Fauna of East Calcutta Wetlands, Project report of Creative Research Group, East Calcutta Wetlands and Waste Recycling (Primary data), Environmental Improvement Programme, Calcutta Metropolitan Water and Sanitation Authority.

Ghosh, S. K., and Santra, S.C. (1996). 'Domestic and Municipal Wastewater Treatment by Some Common Tropical Aquatic Macrophytes', Indian Biologist. vol 28 (1).

Ghosh, A., Maity, B., Chakrabarti, K., Chattopadhyay, D. (2007). Bacterial diversity of East Calcutta Wet land area: possible identification of potential bacterial population for different biotechnological uses. Microb Ecol. Oct;54(3):452-9.

 (1997). 'Economic benefits of wetland vegetation for rural population in West Bengal India', in W. Giesen (ed), Wetland Biodiversity and Development, proceedings of workshop of the International Conference on Wetland and Development, held in Kuala Lumpur, Malaysia, 9–13 October 1995.  Wetlands International Kuala Lumpur.

Ghosh, S., Dinda, S., Chatterjee, N. D., & Das, K. (2018). Analyzing risk factors for shrinkage and transformation of East Kolkata Wetland, India. Spatial Information Research, 26(6), 661–677.

Good R.E., Whigham, D. F., and Simpson, R.L.(1978). (eds.) Freshwater Wetlands, Ecological Processes and Management Potential, Academic Press, New York.

Holling, C. S., Schindler, D.W., Walker, B.W., and Roughgarden, J.(1955). 'Biodiversity in the functioning of the ecosystem, an ecological synthesis', in Parings et al. (eds.), Biodiversity Loss, Economic and Ecological issues, Cambridge University Press.

Instit;ute for Wetland Management and Ecological Design (1997).  A study on the status of sewage of Calcutta as carrier of pollutants, nutrients and sediments, Report submitted to the West Bengal Pollution Control Board, Calcutta.

ISI (2001). Report on Environmental Conservation and Valuation of East Calcutta Wetlands 999–2000, World Bank aided 'India Environmental Capacity Building' Technical Assistance Project.

Irrigation and Waterways Directorate (1959).  Final Report of the West Bengal Flood Enquiry committee, Government of West Bengal, Irrigation and Waterways Department, Calcutta.

Jana, B. B., Banerjee, R. D., Guterstam, B., and Heeb, J. (2000). (eds.) Waste recycling and resource management in the developing world, University of Kalyani.

Kolstad, C. D., and Guzman, R. (1999). 'Information and the divergence between willingness- to-pay’,Environ.Econ.Mgmt.

Kormondy, E.J.(1974). Concepts of Ecology, Prentice Hall of India, New Delhi.

Larson, J.S. (1976). (ed.). Models for Assessment of Freshwater Wetlands, Water Resources Research Centre, University of Massachusetts, Amherst, USA. publication no. 32, completion report FY 76–5.

Maltby, E.(1986). Waterlogged Wealth, International Institute of Environment and Development, Earthscan, London.

Misra, A.(1993). Aj Bhi Khare Hai Talab, Paryavayaran Kaksh, Gandhi Santi Pratisthan, New Delhi.

Mitchell, B.(1979). Geography and Resource Analysis, Longman, London.

Mitsch. W.J., and Gosselink, J. G. (1986). Wetlands, Van Nostrand Reinhold Company, New York

Monkhouse, F.J., and Wilkinson, H.R.(1976). Maps and Diagrams: Their Compilation and 
Construction, Methuen & Co. Ltd., London

Mukherjee, D.P., Kumar, B., and Saha, R.(2005)  Performance of Sewage - Ponds in Treating Wastewater (unpublished report), Central Pollution Control Board, Eastern Regional Office, Kolkata.

NBSAP(2002). National Biodiversity Strategy and Action Plan, West Bengal State Biodiversity Strategy and Action Plan, Department of Environment, Government of West Bengal and Ramkrishna Mission Narendrapur, West Bengal, India, executed by Ministry of Environment and Forest, Government of India, technical implementation by Kalpavriksh and administrative co-ordination by Biotech Consortium, India Ltd., funded by Global Environmental Facility through UNDP.

Pal, D., and Dasgupta, C. K. (1988). 'Interaction with fish and human pathogens', proceedings of National Symposium on 'Fish and Their Environment, Trivandrum.

Pearce D. W., and Turner R.K.(1990). Economics of natural resources and the environment, Johns Hopkins University Press, Baltimore.

Sachs, W. (2001). Planet Dialectics: Explorations in Environment and Development, Zed
Books, London.

Sarkar, R. (2002). Valuing the ecosystem benefits of treatment of manmade wetlands using conventional economic indicators - a case study of the East Calcutta Wetlands, Occasional Papers no. 01/2002, Department of Business Management, University of Calcutta.

Schuyt, K., and Brander, L. (2004). 'The Economic Values of World's Wetlands', Living
Waters, Conserving the source of life, WWF, Gland/Amsterdam.

Scott, D. A. (1989) (ed.). A Directory of Asian Wetlands. IUCN, Gland, Switzerland, and Cambridge, UK

Sewell, R. B.(1934). A study of the fauna of the Salt Lake, Calcutta. Record of the Indian Museum. 36.
Stewart. D. (1836). 'Report on the project of The Salt Lake Reclamation & Irrigation Company Limited', in Selection from the records of the Bengal Government, (containing papers from 1985 to 1964), Government of West Bengal, Calcutta, India.

Thomas, R. W., and Huggett, R. J. (1980), Modelling in Geography: A Mathematical Approach, Harper & Row, London.

Trisal, C. L., and Zutshi, D. P. (1985). 'Ecology and Management of Wetland Ecosystems in India', Paper presented at the Regional Meeting of the National MAB Committee of Central and South Asian Countries, New Delhi.

Turner, R. K., and Bateman, I. J. (1995). 'Wetland Valuation: three case studies', in Perring et al. (eds.), Biodiversity loss, economic and ecological issues, Cambridge University Press.

UNESCO (2000). Science for the twenty-first century, a new commitment, World Conference on Science.

United Nations Development Programme (1998), Human Development Report 1998, Oxford University Press, New York.

WCED (1987). Our Common Future, World Comkmission on Environment and Development Oxford University Press, Oxford.

World Wide Fund for Nature (1993). Directory of Indian Wetlands.

Specific

External links

East Calcutta Wetlands (World Wildlife Fund, India)
East Kolkata Wetlands (New Agriculturist)
Facebook Group dedicated to East Kolkata Wetlands
India – East Calcutta - Making the Most of It: Wastewater, Fishponds, and Agriculture
CONSERVATION AND UTILIZATION OF MICROBIAL DIVERSITY, National Biodiversity Authority, 2005
Bengal Food Bowl Under Threat, Science Reporter, June 2015 by Shakunt Pandey
Bird species of East Kolkata Weltands - A photographic collection

Geography of Kolkata
Ramsar sites in India
Constructed wetlands